Judi Ann Genovesi (married name: Adler 1984 to 2012; Whaling 2014 to present; born June 21, 1957 in Manchester, Connecticut) is an American ice dancer. With partner Kent Weigle, she is the 1977 U.S. national champion. They represented the United States at the 1976 Winter Olympics where they placed 15th.

Competitive highlights
(with Weigle)

References

 
  

American female ice dancers
Figure skaters at the 1976 Winter Olympics
Olympic figure skaters of the United States
1957 births
Living people
Sportspeople from Manchester, Connecticut
21st-century American women